Dorothy Spencer (née Sidney; later Smythe), Countess of Sunderland (5 October 1617 (baptised) – 5 February 1684), was the wife of Henry Spencer, 1st Earl of Sunderland, and the daughter of Robert Sidney, 2nd Earl of Leicester, and Lady Dorothy Percy.

Lady Dorothy Sidney (or Sydney) was celebrated not only for her beauty but for wit, charm and intelligence. In about 1635, she rejected a marriage proposal from the poet Edmund Waller, who addressed verses to her under the nickname "Sacharissa" (which he based on the Latin word sacharum, meaning "sugar").

On 20 July 1639 at Penhurst, she married Henry Spencer. It seems to have been a love marriage and had her family's wholehearted approval: her father after her husband's death wrote that he thanked God for the part he had played in her happiness.Kenyon  p.1 In 1643, Spencer was created 1st Earl of Sunderland in recognition of his service to King Charles I in the English Civil War. Spencer was killed at the First Battle of Newbury, leaving Dorothy with two children, and pregnant with a third, who died young. Their children were:

 Lady Dorothy Spencer
 Robert Spencer, 2nd Earl of Sunderland
 Lady Penelope Spencer (c. 1642–1667), died unmarried.

The widowed countess lived at Brington, Northamptonshire, but eventually returned to Penshurst Place in Kent to live with her parents. In 1652 she remarried to Sir Robert Smythe of Bidborough, Kent, and had a second son, also named Robert.

Her letters show both her intelligence and her clear-sightedness, even about those closest to her. While her son and daughter-in-law could see no fault in their eldest son, Robert, Lord Spencer, Dorothy wrote dryly of her grandson: "He has no good nature or humour, is scornful and pretending… comes to me seldom, seems weary in a minute, talks of my company [guests] as though I picked them up in the streets…".

Her death has been attributed to the grief caused by her brother Algernon's trial and execution for treason in December 1683. Her grave is in Everdon, Northamptonshire.

Bibliography
Sacharissa; some account of Dorothy Sidney, Countess of Sunderland, her family and friends, 1617-1684 by Julia Mary Cartwright Ady (1926)
Kenyon, J.P. Robert Spencer Earl of Sunderland 1741-1702 Longman Green and Co. 1958 Reprinted by Gregg Revivals 1992

References 

1617 births
1684 deaths
English countesses
Daughters of British earls
Dorothy
Dorothy
17th-century English women
17th-century English people